"Love Will Find Its Way to You" is a song written by Dave Loggins and J.D. Martin, and recorded by American country music artist Reba McEntire.  It was released in January 1988 as the second single from the album The Last One to Know.  The song was McEntire's tenth number one country single.  The single went to number one for one week and spent a total of thirteen weeks within the top 40. It was previously recorded by Lee Greenwood for his 1986 album of the same name and by Marie Osmond on her 1985 album, There's No Stopping Your Heart.

Charts

Weekly charts

Year-end charts

References

1988 singles
1985 songs
Marie Osmond songs
Lee Greenwood songs
Reba McEntire songs
Songs written by Dave Loggins
Song recordings produced by Jimmy Bowen
MCA Records singles
Songs written by J. D. Martin (songwriter)